The Nolan Show, hosted by Stephen Nolan, airs on weekdays on BBC Radio Ulster and BBC Radio Foyle from 9:00am – 10:30am.

Nolan has also moved onto a network platform, hosting Question Time Extra Time every Thursday night and a three-hour phone-in program on BBC Radio Five Live every Friday to Sunday night. He has also been voted UK Speech Broadcaster of the Year, and has gained similar success as a television presenter, being voted the Royal Television Society’s Presenter of the Year in 2005 and 2006.

Production
The Tuesday to Friday editions of the Nolan Show are broadcast from studios at the BBC Northern Ireland headquarters in Broadcasting House, Belfast. The Monday edition of the Nolan Show is broadcast from MediaCityUK in Salford because of Nolan's BBC Radio 5 Live commitments.

References

External links

BBC Stephen Nolan website

Radio programmes in Northern Ireland
BBC Radio Ulster programmes